Świeszewo is a village in the administrative district of Gmina Świercze, within Pułtusk County, Masovian Voivodeship, in east-central Poland.

The village has a population of 110.

References

Villages in Pułtusk County